North Nanaimo was an electoral district in the province of British Columbia, Canada in the 1894, 1898 and 1900 elections only.

For other historical and current ridings named Nanaimo or in the area of Nanaimo, British Columbia please see Nanaimo (electoral districts).

Election results 
Note:  Winners of each election are in bold.

|-

 
|Labour
|Ralph Smith1
|align="right"|139 	 	
|align="right"|25.27%
|align="right"|
|align="right"|unknown
|- bgcolor="white"
!align="right" colspan=3|Total valid votes
!align="right"|550
!align="right"|100.00%
!align="right"|
|- bgcolor="white"
!align="right" colspan=3|Total rejected ballots
!align="right"|
!align="right"|
!align="right"|
|- bgcolor="white"
!align="right" colspan=3|Turnout
!align="right"|%
!align="right"|
!align="right"|
|- bgcolor="white"
!align="right" colspan=7|1 <small>Nominated by the Nanaimo Reform Club, which had been set up by the Opposition but was dominated by the Miners' and Mine-Labourers' Protective Association (MMLPA). The slate was described as "a labor ticket on a labor platform, but with outside support." (T.R. Loosmore, "The British Columbia Labor Movement and Political Action, 1878-1906", 1954, p. 67(2).)  	
|}

|-

|- bgcolor="white"
!align="right" colspan=3|Total valid votes
!align="right"|402
!align="right"|100.00%
!align="right"|
|- bgcolor="white"
!align="right" colspan=3|Total rejected ballots
!align="right"|
!align="right"|
!align="right"|
|- bgcolor="white"
!align="right" colspan=3|Turnout
!align="right"|%
!align="right"|
!align="right"|
|}

The riding was redistributed before the 1903 election. Successor ridings were (roughly) Nanaimo City, Newcastle and The Islands.

Former provincial electoral districts of British Columbia